William Bailiff (fl. 1386) was an English politician.

He was a Member (MP) of the Parliament of England for Great Bedwyn in 1386. Nothing more is known of him.

References

Year of birth missing
Year of death missing
English MPs 1386
14th-century English politicians
Members of Parliament for Great Bedwyn